Ruben Zepuntke (born 29 January 1993) is a German professional triathlete.

Biography
Zepuntke was born, raised, and resides in Düsseldorf, North Rhine-Westphalia, Germany. His father, Lutz, is a landscape architect working in local government. His mother, Klaudia, is a community nurse and local Social Democratic politician in Düsseldorf, who was elected to the city council in 2009 and became one of three Honorary Mayors serving under the city's Lord Mayor Thomas Geisel in 2014. He also has a sister, Nora, who works as a teacher in special education.

Major results
Sources:

2010
 3rd Road race, National Junior Road Championships
 6th Overall Regio-Tour Juniors
 8th Overall Trofeo Karlsberg
2011
 1st  Time trial, National Junior Road Championships
 2nd Overall Niedersachsen Rundfahrt Juniors
 5th Paris–Roubaix Juniors
2012
 1st Stage 1 (TTT) Thüringen Rundfahrt der U23
 4th Rund um den Finanzplatz Eschborn–Frankfurt U23
 7th Paris–Roubaix Espoirs
 7th Omloop der Kempen
2013
 9th Overall Le Triptyque des Monts et Châteaux
2014
 3rd Overall Tour of Alberta
1st Stage 1
2016
 1st Stage 1 (TTT) Czech Cycling Tour

References

External links

Cycling Base: Ruben Zepuntke
Cycling Quotient: Ruben Zepuntke

Cannondale-Garmin: Ruben Zepuntke

1993 births
Living people
German male cyclists
Sportspeople from Düsseldorf
Cyclists from North Rhine-Westphalia
German male triathletes